The Pangkajene and Islands Regency (Indonesian: Kabupaten Pangkajene dan Kepulauan, usually shortened to Pangkep), is a regency of South Sulawesi Province of Indonesia. The regency lies primarily on the mainland of Sulawesi's southern peninsula, but also includes the Spermonde Islands (Kepulauan Spermonde) off the west coast of that peninsula, as well as other small islands further west and southwest. The principal town lies at Pangkajene on Sulawesi, but there are a series of further small towns like Lejang, Labakkang, Bonto-Bonto and Segeri proceeding northwards from Pangkajene along the Trans-Sulawesi Highway. The total land area is 1,112.29 km2, and the population was 305,737 at the 2010 Census and 345,775 at the 2020 Census; the official estimate as at mid 2021 was 348,230.

Administrative Districts 
The Regency comprises thirteen administrative Districts (Kecamatan) - nine on the mainland of Sulawesi and four comprising islands off its coast. These are tabulated below with their areas and their populations at the 2010 Census  and the 2020 Census, together with the official estimates as at mid 2021. The table also includes the locations of the district administrative centres, the number of administrative villages (rural desa and urban kelurahan) in each district, and its post code(s).

The Regency includes four districts which cover 115 small islands off the west and south coasts of South Sulawesi Province. Liukang Tangaya comprises 55 islands off the south and southwest of Sulawesi; Liukang Tupabbiring and Liukang Tupabbiring Utara together comprise the 43 Spermonde Islands off the west coast of South Sulawesi; and Liukang Kalmas comprises 17 other islands more to the west of South Sulawesi.

Climate
Pangkajene has a tropical monsoon climate (Am) with moderate to little rainfall from June to October and heavy to very rainfall from November to May. The following climate data is for the town of Pangkajene.

References

Regencies of South Sulawesi